Vida Hajebi (Hadjebi) Tabrizi (1936–2017) was an Iranian social justice activist and writer.

Activism
She was arrested in July 1972 in Tehran, and imprisoned for 6 years. In 1974 Columbia University sociologist Allan Silver personally took a letter of protest signed by the Canadian Association of Sociologists to Iranian Embassy in Washington, D.C. regarding her detention. American Feminist Kate Millett, the National Organization for Women representative and Anne Roberts, Amnesty International representative and other concerned U.S citizens publicly denounced the treatment of women prisoners of conscience in Iran.

Works
She wrote several books. Her book "Daad va Bidaad" - in Persian - was about women in prisons in Iran.

Awards and honors
She was a prisoner of conscience for seven years and In 1978 she named as the "Prisoner of the Year " by Amnesty International.

Death
She died in Paris at the age of 81.

References

1936 births
2017 deaths
Amnesty International prisoners of conscience held by Iran